Matteo Marsaglia (born October 5, 1985 in Rome) is a World Cup alpine ski racer from Italy and specializes in the speed events of downhill and super-G.

Biography
Marsaglia made his World Cup debut in February 2008 in France. His first World Cup podium was a victory, in the Super-G at Beaver Creek, Colorado, in December 2012.

He is the brother of fellow alpine racer Francesca Marsaglia.

World Cup results

Season standings

Race podiums
 1 win - (1 SG)  
 2 podiums - (2 SG); 18 top tens (10 SG, 5 DH, 3 AC)

World Championship results

Olympic results

National titles
Marsaglia has won eight national titles.

Italian Alpine Ski Championships
Downhill: 2011, 2015, 2019 (3)
Super-G: 2012, 2014, 2018, 2019 (4)
Combined: 2018 (1)

References

External links
 
 
 Rossignol - alpine racing - Matteo Marsaglia
 Italian Winter Sports Federation - (FISI) - alpine skiing - Matteo Marsaglia - 

1985 births
Living people
Italian male alpine skiers
Alpine skiers of Gruppo Sportivo Esercito
Alpine skiers at the 2018 Winter Olympics
Alpine skiers at the 2022 Winter Olympics
Olympic alpine skiers of Italy
Sportspeople from Rome